Bell High School may refer to:

Bell High School (Ottawa), Ontario, Canada
Bell High School (California), United States
Bell Middle/High School (Florida), United States

See also
Bell County High School, Pineville, Kentucky, United States
L. D. Bell High School, Hurst, Texas, United States